"Must of Got Lost" is a rock song by the American rock band The J. Geils Band. Released in 1974, the single reached in No. 12 the following year. Allmusic critic Joe Viglione described it as "one of the most memorable tunes by The J. Geils Band."  A live version of the song, with an extended spoken-word introduction by Peter Wolf, appears on Blow Your Face Out, J. Geils Band's second live album.  The live version receives considerable airplay on album-oriented rock format stations.

Background
The title is grammatically incorrect and can be said to be an example of a common eggcorn.
Billboard described the melody as "one long hook" and the sound of the song as "funky."  Cash Box called it "a rocker with solid instrumentation and a full arrangement [that] is augmented by the backing harmonies and some good lead guitar licks."  Record World said that it was the band's "most commercial AM effort in some time" with "good pacing and balance between vocal and instrumental ends."  Ultimate Classic Rock critic Michael Gallucci rated it to be the band's 2nd greatest song, saying that the live version on Blow Your Face Out is the best version, in which "the energy levels are pushed to a whole other level of greatness."

Chart performance

Weekly charts

Year-end charts

Popular culture
This song is featured in the 2004 Disney movie Miracle and in the end-credits of the series finale of Eastbound & Down.

References

1974 singles
The J. Geils Band songs
Song recordings produced by Bill Szymczyk
Songs written by Seth Justman
Songs written by Peter Wolf
1974 songs
Atlantic Records singles